

Avenue of the Arts is a city-designated arts cultural district on a segment of Broad Street in Philadelphia, Pennsylvania that includes many of the city's cultural institutions, most notably the theater district south of City Hall.  The designation can be found as far south as Washington Avenue and as far north as the Cecil B. Moore neighborhood.

History
The name Avenue of the Arts originated in a strategy by mayor Ed Rendell to redevelop South Broad Street in Center City. Avenue of the Arts originally ran along Broad Street from Locust Street south to Lombard Street. The Avenue's definition was expanded to North Broad Street by city planners under mayor John F. Street's administration to encourage further development in the area. The Avenue of the Arts is overseen by the non-profit organization Avenue of the Arts, Inc. led by Karen Lewis, the organization's executive director.

Features

Avenue of the Arts is the locale for many of the city's large theatres, including Kimmel Center for the Performing Arts (home of the Philadelphia Orchestra), the Academy of Music, Miller Theater, Wilma Theater, Liacouras Center, and Suzanne Roberts Theatre.  Buildings for the University of the Arts are located just south and east of the Kimmel Center; the Miller Theatre is often used for high-end productions involving the school.

Philadelphia International Records' offices and gift shop is also located along this strip. Just south of the strip is the Clef Club of Jazz and Performing Arts, and on Broad Street in this vicinity, just north of City Hall, is the Pennsylvania Academy of Fine Arts, which, founded in 1805, is America's oldest art school and museum and boasts a distinguished collection of American art.

Several parking garages and public transportation services provided by SEPTA and DRPA at the Walnut–Locust, 12-13th Street, and 15-16th Street stations, served by the Broad Street Line and the Lindenwold Line.  The availability of public transportation makes Avenue of the Arts highly accessible to visitors.

See also

 Broad Street (Philadelphia)
 Broad Street Historic District (Philadelphia)
 Avenue of Technology (Philadelphia)

References
Notes

Bibliography
Bounds, Anna Maria. "Philadelphia's Avenue of the Arts: the Challenges of a Cultural District Initinative" in Tourism, Culture and Regeneration, Melanie K. Smith, editor. pp 132–142. CABI, 2006.
Brooks, Arthur C. and Roland J. Kishner. International Journal of Arts Management, Vol. 3, No. 2 (WINTER 2001), "Cultural Districts and Urban Development". pp. 4–15.
Campoa, Daniel and Brent D. Ryanb. Journal of Urban Design, Volume 13, Issue 3, 2008, "The Entertainment Zone: Unplanned Nightlife and the Revitalization of the American Downtown", pp. 291–315, DOI: 10.1080/13574800802319543.
Carrabc, James H. and Lisa J. Servond. Journal of the American Planning Association, Volume 75, Issue 1, 2008, "Vernacular Culture and Urban Economic Development: Thinking Outside the (Big) Box", pp. 28–40. DOI: 10.1080/01944360802539226.
McGovern, Stephen J. Policy & Politics, Volume 25, Number 2, April 1997, "Mayoral leadership and economic development policy: the case of Ed Rendell's Philadelphia", pp. 153–172(20).
Strom, Elizabeth. International Journal of Cultural Policy, Volume 9, Issue 3, 2003, "Cultural policy as development policy: evidence from the United States". pp. 247–263.

External links

Official website

Arts districts
Arts organizations based in Pennsylvania
Center City, Philadelphia
Culture of Philadelphia
Philadelphia
Tourist attractions in Philadelphia